Trachymene ochracea (common names white parsnip, wild parsnip, yellow parsnip) is a herb in the family Araliaceae. It is native to Australia and found in New South Wales and Queensland.

Description 
The leaves are consist of 3-5 deeply dissected lobes on stalks (petioles) up to 10 cm long. The inflorescences are umbels borne on dichasial cymes. The umbels have 30 to 60 flowers, are from 7 mm to 18 mm in diameter on stalks (peduncles) which are 3 to 8 cm long and are glandular-hairy near the stalk base. The flowers are bisexual, with white petals (pink in bud). The ovary has two locules.

The plant is prolific after rain, growing in mulga and mallee communities on red earths and on sand.

Taxonomy 
Trachymene ochracea was first described by Lawrence Alexander Sidney Johnson in 1962, from a specimen collected west of the Paroo River, in New South Wales, near Hungerford by  J.L. Boorman in October 1912 (NSW 54006).

Etymology
The species epithet, ochracea, is the Latin adjective, ochraceus,-a,-um which means "ovhre-yellow" or "yellowish-brown".

Gallery

References

External links 

 Trachymene ochracea occurrence data from The Australasian Virtual Herbarium

ochracea
Flora of Queensland
Flora of New South Wales
Plants described in 1962
Taxa named by Lawrence Alexander Sidney Johnson